Murray High School is the only high school in the Murray City School District in Murray, Utah. Murray High School is in the Salt Lake City metropolitan area with 1,465 students enrolled in the 2019–20 school year. The school enrolls students in grades 10–12. The school's mascot is the Spartan, and the school colors are orange and black. Murray High is a 5-A school in Utah's 6 Division high school sports leagues (1A being the smallest, and 6A being the largest).  The Disney Channel reality show High School Musical: Get in the Picture was shot on the Murray High campus in 2008, and American Idol season 7 runner-up David Archuleta attended the school. The school also offers the highest number of Salt Lake Community College Concurrent Enrollment classes in the state of Utah.

Building history
Murray High School was originally located on the east side of State Street at the current Hillcrest Junior High location, another Murray City School District School, at 126 East 5300 South Murray, UT. From 1916 to 1954 Murray Junior High was named Murray High and Junior High. It was rebuilt and moved across to the west side of State Street in 1954.

Academics

Salt Lake Community College Concurrent Enrollment offers over 120 classes which students can take and earn SLCC credit and also in-state college credit. Murray High ranks #1 in the state for the number of SLCC (Salt Lake Community College) associate degrees earned by high school seniors.

Murray High School is one of the few schools in Utah piloting the Utah State Office of Education U-PASS & criterion-referenced tests (CRTs) online. The school has received $100,000 to purchase new laptops and upgrade current computers. The administration of Spring 2008 criterion-referenced tests (CRTs) through computer-based testing (CBT) was performed through Pearson's assessment systems. In recent years, SAGE testing has taken over the role that CRT testing once held in the school.

Going green
At the beginning of 2007-2008, administrators and MHS's Environmental Club started a program to save energy and money. Adjustments at the school, and other schools and offices in the district,  included changes to the thermostats and turning off running water in the restrooms and unplugging machines during weekends and long breaks. This has caused difficulties for the instrumental music programs at Murray High since instruments can sustain harm when temperatures are allowed to drop drastically over long school breaks. Recycling bins have been placed throughout the school. Students are sent to detention if they are found to have wasted excessive amounts of water. Since its beginnings, the district has saved $405,000, all of which went into teachers' budgets. It is projected that the district will have saved one million dollars or a twenty percent savings per month in four years.

Controversy
In 2004, Murray High School prohibited same-sex students from participating in the promenade of their prom. Press coverage noted the similarity to Aaron Fricke vs. Richard B. Lynch, a landmark case in high school student LGBT rights. 
 Using Fricke as a precedent, the ACLU threatened to sue the high school on behalf of its gay and lesbian students. The high school reversed its policy and allowed a 17-year-old lesbian student to dance with her girlfriend at the prom.

Another recent controversy was when some students passed around white privilege cards.

Films and other productions shot at Murray

 A few of the scenes from the wrestling movie Take Down (1978) were filmed prior to the rebuilding.
 Read It and Weep (2006) 
 The auditorium scene of High School Musical (2006)
 Minutemen (2008)
 High School Musical: Get in the Picture (2008)
 The school was the host venue for American Idol season 7 runner-up David Archuleta's homecoming television episode

Sports national titles
Men's Inline Hockey 1998, 2005

Notable alumni
 David Archuleta (class of 2009), runner-up on season 7 of American Idol
Britton Johnsen, NBA basketball player; Utah's Mr. Basketball 1996–1997; player for the Turkish club Galatasaray Cafe Crown
 Braxton Jones, NFL player for the Chicago Bears
 Mark Koncar, NFL player for the Green Bay Packers (retired)
 Nathaniel Coleman, 3-time National Men's Bouldering champion and Team Petzl professional climbers

References

External links

Murray High School website
Murray City School District
Murray Schools - About MHS
"Murray High teen moving up on 'Idol'"
Murray Spartans historical high school football scores

Public high schools in Utah
Educational institutions established in 1916
Schools in Salt Lake County, Utah
Buildings and structures in Murray, Utah
1916 establishments in Utah